Senator Kramer may refer to:

Benjamin F. Kramer (born 1957), Maryland State Senate
Don Kramer (politician) (born 1940), Minnesota State Senate
Mary Kramer (born 1935), Iowa State Senate
Rona E. Kramer (born 1954), Maryland State Senate
Sidney Kramer (born 1925), Maryland State Senate

See also
Kenneth F. Cramer (1894–1954), Connecticut State Senate
Kevin Cramer (born 1961), U.S. Senator for North Dakota since 2019